David Donaldson (born 1960) is a New Zealand composer and performer. He is principally known for his involvement in film music and as a creator of film soundtrack and musical sound design.

Composing 
Plan 9 has also been involved in designing the soundtracks of the New Zealand Pavilion at World Expo Shanghai 2010.

Recording 
David Donaldson, Steve Roche and Janet Roddick have been part of the eclectic Wellington music scene for over twenty five years. They first collaborated as members of the electric 1980s band Six Volts and continued with the Brainchilds. Roche and Donaldson are involved in a band called The Labcoats with David Long, Anthony Donaldson, Riki Gooch and Toby Laing. They also comprise a band called "Thrashing Marlin". The band made a big splash in 1996 with their debut, and was followed by a second release, "Garage Sailors" in 1999. In 2006, they produced their third album, "Wit’s end"  which is a collection of lo-fi, experimental pop music which ranges from a take on a Len Lye vocal sample (All You've Got Someday) to a Janet Roddick composition (Sea of Tranquility). "The finished project is always an envelope-pushing but accessible blend of pop songwriting instincts within the sprawl of free-improvisational jazz and collage-rock. Early Split Enz and The Mutton Birds spring to mind as obvious touchstones".

References

External links
 Plan 9 website (archived version at the WayBack Machine)
 

1960 births
Living people
New Zealand musicians